Famine-33 (Holod-33) is a 1991 drama film by Oles Yanchuk about the Holodomor famine in Ukraine, and based on the novel The Yellow Prince by Vasyl Barka. The film is told through the lives of the Katrannyk family of six. The film was made on a voluntary basis. The main producer of the film was the Transcarpathian bank "Lisbank", which was to receive a share of rental income. However, after watching the finished film, the producers were so moved that they decided to refuse to return the money, and insisted that as many people as possible see the film.

Synopsis
"In an early scene, the members of an impoverished farming family solemnly take turns dipping their ladles into the single bowl of watery soup that is their only meal of the day. Later in the film, scores of villagers numb with despair and hunger huddle silently in the pouring rain outside a Government office until a truckload of armed soldiers arrives to disperse them. In the most poignant scene, a little boy who has lost his parents calls for his mother as he wanders, panic-stricken, through a snowy woodland where the trees are outnumbered by crosses marking the dead."

Cast
 Halyna Sulyma as Dariya Katrannyk
 Heorhiy Moroziuk as Myron Katrannyk
 Oleksiy Horbunov as Bilshovyk
 Maksym Koval
 Olenka Kovtun
 Kostyantyn Kazymirenko
 Neonila Svitlychna
 Leonid Yanovsky
 Petro Beniuk
 Leo Okrent — episode
 Oleh Isayev
 Tetiana Slobidska
 Svetlana Romashko
 Larysa Kadyrova
 Alidzhan Soluyan
 Ivan Bondar — an episode
 С. Gordienko — episode
 Oleksandr Dubovych — episode
 Yuriy Dubrovin — episode
 Maksym Kondratiuk — episode
 Natalia Kononova — episode
 Myroslav Makoviychuk — episode
 Ihor Slobidskyi — episode
 Olena Yanchuk — episode

Awards 
1991 — 1st All-Ukrainian Film Festival in Kyiv — Main Prize.

2009 — the main prize of the Vincennes Film Festival — the Henri Langlois Prize.

See also
 The Undefeated (2000 film)
 The Guide (film)
 Bitter Harvest (2017 film)
 Holodomor in Ukraine

References

External links

Ukrainian-language films
Soviet drama films
Dovzhenko Film Studios films
1991 films
1991 drama films
Films about famine
Films set in Ukraine
Films about the Holodomor
Ukrainian drama films